Quanguo Waiyu Shuiping Kaoshi ("National Foreign Language Proficiency Test," WSK) is a series of foreign language tests administered in Mainland China for educators who did not major in foreign languages. The National Education Examinations Authority (NEEA) of China developed these tests. Performance on the WSK determines whether one is permitted to take training, studies, or additional studies within one's major in institutions outside of China.

Some universities make successful completion of the WSK as a requirement for promotion in one's academic title.

The Public English Test System (PETS) is the test for the English language, available in five levels: PETS-1 through PETS-5. The other versions are TNF for the French language, NTD for the German language, NNS (日本語能力試験 Nihongo Nōryoku Shiken) for the Japanese language, and ТПРЯ ( "Russian Language Proficiency Test") for the Russian language.

See also
 College English Test (CET)

References

External links
 Quanguo Waiyu Shuiping Kaoshi 
 Public English Test System 
 China Public English Test System (PETS), Levels 1-5: Level Criteria, Test Specifications and Sample Materials. National Education Examinations Authority, 1999. See profile at Google Books.

Education in China
Language tests